The Union Street station was a station on the demolished section of the BMT Fifth Avenue Line in Brooklyn, New York City. Served by trains of the BMT Culver Line and BMT Fifth Avenue Line, it had 2 tracks and 2 side platforms. The station was opened on June 22, 1889 at the intersection of Fifth Avenue and Union Street, and had a connection to the Union Street Line trolleys. The next stop to the north was Saint Marks Avenue. The next stop to the south was Third Street. It closed on May 31, 1940.

References

BMT Fifth Avenue Line stations
Railway stations in the United States opened in 1889
Railway stations closed in 1940
Former elevated and subway stations in Brooklyn
1889 establishments in New York (state)
1940 disestablishments in New York (state)